Ferdinando Hastings, 6th Earl of Huntingdon (18 January 1609 – 13 February 1656), was the son of Henry Hastings, 5th Earl of Huntingdon, and Lady Elizabeth Stanley, the daughter of Ferdinando Stanley, 5th Earl of Derby, and Alice Spencer. He married Lucy, daughter of Sir John Davies, on 7 August 1623.

He was MP for Leicestershire in 1625 and again in 1628–29.

Ferdinando's family seat, Ashby de la Zouch Castle, was destroyed by Oliver Cromwell's troops in the English Civil War in 1646. He died of smallpox at age 47 and was succeeded by his son, Theophilus Hastings, 7th Earl of Huntingdon.

There is a monument to him in St Helen's Church, Ashby-de-la-Zouch.

References
Thepeerage.com
 
 

|-

|-

|-

|-

1609 births
1656 deaths
Lord-Lieutenants of Leicestershire
Lord-Lieutenants of Rutland
People from Ashby-de-la-Zouch
Ferdinando Hastings, 06th Earl of Huntingdon
English MPs 1625
English MPs 1628–1629
Deaths from smallpox
6
Alumni of Queens' College, Cambridge
Barons Hastings
Members of the Parliament of England for Leicestershire
Barons Botreaux
Barons Hungerford